Ilario Lanna (born 20 May 1990 in Rome) is an Italian footballer who plays as a defender for the Maltese side Mosta FC.

Career
Born in Rome, Ilario Lanna played in 2008–09 season for S.S. Sambenedettese Calcio in Lega Pro Prima Divisione. On 2 September 2009, Bulgarian side Botev Plovdiv signed Lanna, He was given the number 90 shirt.

References

External links
 Player Profile
 Player Profile
 Player Profile
 Player Profile
 Player Profile

1990 births
Living people
Italian footballers
Association football defenders
A.S. Sambenedettese players
Botev Plovdiv players
First Professional Football League (Bulgaria) players
Expatriate footballers in Bulgaria
Italian expatriates in Bulgaria
Mosta F.C. players